Osmyn Baker (May 18, 1800 – February 9, 1875) was a U.S. Representative from Massachusetts.

Born in Amherst, Massachusetts, Baker attended Amherst Academy.
He was graduated from Yale College in 1822.
He studied law at Northampton Law School.
He was admitted to the bar and commenced practice in Amherst in 1825.
He served as member of the Massachusetts House of Representatives 1833, 1834, 1836, and 1837.
County commissioner of Hampshire County, Massachusetts 1834–1837.

Baker was elected as a Whig to the Twenty-sixth Congress to fill the vacancy caused by the death of James C. Alvord.
Baker was reelected to the Twenty-seventh and Twenty-eighth Congresses and served from January 14, 1840, to March 3, 1845.
He served as chairman of the Committee on Accounts (Twenty-seventh Congress).
He was not a candidate for renomination in 1844.
He resumed the practice of law at Northampton in 1845.
Baker was the first president of Smith Charities, serving from 1860 to 1870.
He died in Northampton, Massachusetts, February 9, 1875.
He was interred in Bridge Street Cemetery.

References

1800 births
1875 deaths
Politicians from Amherst, Massachusetts
Yale College alumni
County commissioners in Massachusetts
Members of the Massachusetts House of Representatives
Northampton Law School alumni
Whig Party members of the United States House of Representatives from Massachusetts
19th-century American politicians